Rykiv is a village (selo) in Stryi Raion, Lviv Oblast (province) of western Ukraine. It is located in the Ukrainian Carpathians. Rykiv  belongs to Kozova rural hromada, one of the hromadas of Ukraine.
Local government — Rykivska village council.
The first record of the village dates back to 1608.

Until 18 July 2020, Rykiv belonged to Skole Raion. The raion was abolished in July 2020 as part of the administrative reform of Ukraine, which reduced the number of raions of Lviv Oblast to seven. The area of Skole Raion was merged into Stryi Raion.

References

External links 
 village Rykiv
 weather.in.ua

Villages in Stryi Raion